Prays citri, the citrus blossom moth or citrus young fruit borer, is a moth of the family Praydidae. It is found in Southern Europe. There are reports of D. citri in other regions, but these are likely to be misidentifications of other Prays species: P. endocarpa in the Indian subcontinent and southeast Asia, P. endolemma in the Philippines and P. nepholemima in Borneo and Australasia.

The adult moth is dull grey with a wingspan of 10–12 mm.

The larvae feed on Citrus species, preferably Citrus limonum, Citrus decumana and less Citrus aurantium, and are considered an agricultural pest. Eggs are laid on flowers and young fruits, larvae hatching from these and then boring into the plants.

References

Plutellidae
Moths of Africa
Moths of Europe
Insects of Zimbabwe
Moths of Réunion
Moths of the Middle East
Moths described in 1873